Nuyorican Soul is an American music group from New York City, New York. It was formed by Little Louie Vega and Kenny "Dope" Gonzalez.

In 1996, the group released "Runaway". The single reached number one on the Billboard Dance Club Songs chart and the UK Dance Singles Chart. In 1997, the group released a studio album, Nuyorican Soul. It featured guest appearances from George Benson, Roy Ayers, Tito Puente, DJ Jazzy Jeff, Jocelyn Brown, Vincent Montana Jr., Salsoul Orchestra, and India. It peaked at number 25 on the UK Albums Chart. A 2006 reissue version of the album includes an additional bonus disc.

Discography
Studio albums
 Nuyorican Soul (1997)

Compilation albums
 The Remixes (1998)

Singles
 "The Nervous Track" (1993)
 "Mind Fluid" (1996)
 "Runaway" (1996) 
 "You Can Do It (Baby)" (1996) 
 "It's Alright, I Feel It!" (1997) 
 "I Am the Black Gold of the Sun" (1997) 
 "I Love the Nightlife (Disco 'Round)" (1998)

References

External links
 
 

American musical duos
Record production duos
Talkin' Loud artists